The 1918–19 Georgia Bulldogs basketball team represents the University of Georgia during the 1918–19 college men's basketball season. The team captain of the 1918–19 season was A.H. Cox.

Schedule

|-

References

Georgia Bulldogs basketball seasons
Georgia
Bulldogs
Bulldogs